The Sanders "Sandy" Estes Unit is a privately operated prison in Venus, Texas. It is owned by the Texas Department of Criminal Justice and operated by the Management & Training Corporation.

Background
Originally opened in 1989, the Sanders Estes Correctional Center houses minimum and medium security inmates. Inmates’ intensive program service needs are addressed.
The facility offers a wide range of programmatic opportunities to better prepare offenders for re-entry into
society.
In January 2009, MTC was awarded a 6-year, 9-month
contract to operate the facility.

Community service
The Sanders Estes Unit assists local
communities by providing offender crews for city,
county and state work projects. The facility donates
about 1200 hours of inmate community service each
month.

Sanders Estes also partners with a local animal shelter to provide offenders with an opportunity to participate in the
rehabilitation of abused and neglected dogs. The program runs ten weeks and focuses on animal rehabilitation through companionship, nutrition, daily exercise routines and obedience training. Upon successful
completion of the program, the animals are placed with
a suitable family.

Accreditation
•American Correctional Association (ACA) accreditation

•Correctional Education Association (CEA) accreditation

Rehabilitation Programs
•Orientation

•Education and Testing

Education
•ABE

•Pre-GED

•GED

Career and Technical
•P.E.P.

•Building Trades

•Electrical Trade

•Life Skills

•CHANGES

Work and Training
•Hill College sponsored Janitorial Maintenance & more.

References
  - Texas Department of Criminal Justice
  - Management & Training Corporation

External links

  - Texas Department of Criminal Justice
  - Management & Training Corporation

Buildings and structures in Johnson County, Texas
Prisons in Texas
Management and Training Corporation
1989 establishments in Texas